Into the Depths of Sorrow is the debut album by American doom metal band Solitude Aeturnus. It was released by Roadrunner Records in 1991.

Track listing
  "Dawn of Antiquity (A Return to Despair)"  1:02
  "Opaque Divinity"  (lyrics: Lyle Steadham; music: John Perez) 6:24
  "Transcending Sentinels"  (lyrics: Kristoff Gabehart; music: Perez) 7:35
  "Dream of Immortality"  (lyrics: Steadham; music: Perez, Edgar Rivera, Robert Lowe) 7:52
  "Destiny Falls to Ruin"  (lyrics: Steadham; music: Perez) 5:05
  "White Ship"  (lyrics: Steadham; music: Steadham, Perez) 6:10
  "Mirror of Sorrow"  (lyrics: Steadham; music: Perez) 7:37
  "Where Angels Dare to Tread"  (lyrics: Gabehart; music: Perez) 5:56

Personnel

Solitude Aeturnus
Robert Lowe – vocals, keyboards
 Edgar Rivera – guitar
 John Perez – guitar, vocals on track 1
 Lyle Steadham – bass, vocals on track 1
 John Covington – drums

Additional personnel 
Tim Kimsey – additional vocals on track 1

References

Solitude Aeturnus albums
1991 debut albums